The Helsenhorn is a mountain of the Lepontine Alps, overlooking Binn in the Swiss canton of Valais. With a height of 3,272 metres above sea level, it is the highest summit of the Binntal. The border with Italy runs approximately 200 metres south-east of the summit and culminates at 3,247 metres.

The east side of the Helsenhorn consists of a large face overlooking the Kriegalp Pass (2,494 m). On the west side is a small glacier named Helsengletscher.

References

External links
Helsenhorn on Hikr

Mountains of the Alps
Alpine three-thousanders
Mountains of Valais
Mountains partially in Italy
Italy–Switzerland border
Lepontine Alps
Mountains of Switzerland